The list of ship launches in 1692 includes a chronological list of some ships launched in 1692.


References

1692
Ship launches